The North Korean Branch Bureau (NKBB) of the Communist Party of Korea (CPK) was established by a CPK conference on 13 October 1945, and was through the merger with New People's Party of Korea replaced by the 1st Central Committee of the Workers' Party of North Korea on 30 August 1946. It changed its name to the Communist Party of North Korea on 10 April 1946 and became independent of the CPK.

Background
In the days following Japan's surrender on 14 August 1945, several communist organisations were created. The first notable attempt was established on either 15, 16 or 17 August, and a public declaration was released on 18 August by the "Seoul District of the Communist Party of Korea". This group would go down in history as the Changan group, and its leading figures were Choe Ik-han, Yi Yong, Cho Tong-ho and Hyon Chun-hyok. An invitation to join the Central Committee of the Changan group was sent to Pak Hon-yong, but the invitation was declined on 19 August. He instead opted to form the Preparatory Committee for the Reconstruction of the Communist Party of Korea (PCR–CPK) and called for the dissolution of the Changan group. The PCR–CPK supported the theory of two-stage revolution, the idea that Korea had to undergo a bourgeoisie democratic revolution before starting a socialist one. Moreover, the PCR–CPK sought to form a people's front under the leadership of the Communist Party of Korea (CPK) to seize power.

On 8 September a meeting composed of representatives from the PCR–CPK, the Changan group and the fairly small Red Flag group was convened. The Changan group were outnumbered three to one and therefore sought to downplay the meeting's importance. Pak Hon-yong told the gathering that the communist movement needed to unite, and wanted those that had "engaged in the underground activity" to lead the party. Nevertheless, Pak Hon-yong said that individuals who had renounced communism during their imprisonment should not take leading party positions. This was a dig at the Changan group, in which several high-standing members had recanted their communist beliefs while imprisoned. Choe Ik-han of the Changan group reacted by criticising the meeting's proposals as being "reformist, economist, and anarchistic". Pak Hon-yong retorted that the proposals laid the groundwork for establishing "a great Bolshevik party combining the revolutionary intelligentsia who have mastered revolutionary theory with the workers who have weathered the experience of the actual movement." The meeting passed three resolutions; on approving Pak Hon-yong's report, on convening a party congress and delegating final authority in picking party personnel to Pak Hon-yong. The Changan group opposed the resolutions.

On 11–14 September the Refounding Congress of the CPK was held, and elected Pak Hon-yong Chairman of a 31-strong Central Committee. The program adopted by the congress opposed cooperation with the landlords and the capitalist class. It claimed those that did collaborate were "joining hands with reactionary fascists to organise the so-called Korean Democratic Party and other associations to deceive the people." The following day, on 15 September, an Enlarged Plenary Session of the South Pyongan Provincial Committee of the Changan group in North Korea (led by Hyon Chun-hyok) criticised CPK's policies. They claimed that the CPK's attitude towards the United Kingdom and the United States was "ambiguous", and believed its posture towards the "democratic camp" led by the Soviet Union was light-hearted. Political scientist Robert Scalapino and Chong-sik Lee theorise that this criticism was actually levelled by the Soviets but was communicated through the Hyon Chun-hyok group since it was the only prominent communist organisation in North Korea at the time.

Shortly after, on 19 September 1945, Kim Il-sung and his partisan unit returned to Korea. Scholar Hak Soon Paik writes that "The Soviet army appears to have taken step-by-step measures to undermine the power bases of the local Communists and to render Kim Il-sung all kinds of assistance in taking over the leadership of the Communist [organisations] in North Korea." In tandem with Kim Il-sung's arrival, a group of card-carrying members of the Communist Party of the Soviet Union with Korean ethnicity arrived. This group would later be dubbed the Soviet Korean faction and would play a pivotal role in Kim Il-sung's consolidation of power. The Soviets helped Kim Il-sung organise the Proposers' Committee for the Provincial Party Organisations in North Korea on either 29 or 30 September, and on either 1 or 8 October they organised a meeting between him and Pak Hon-yong. They discussed the possibility of establishing a separate communist organisation in North Korea but Pak Hon-yong opposed the scheme. Soviet Major General Andrei Romanenko chipped in and took Kim Il-sung's side, and advised them to establish a North Korean Branch Bureau (NKBB) under the CPK. Pak Hon-yong conceded to the demands on one condition; that the bureau would be subordinate to the CPK Central Committee. Hak Soon Paik contends that this turn of events is proof of "the Soviet army's policy, from the beginning,  to set up an independent party organ in the North." With the two leading Korean communists in agreement, the Soviets organised the Conference of Korean Communist Party Members and Enthusiasts in the Five Northwestern Provinces (CKCPMEFNP) on 10–13 October 1945.

Conference of Members and Enthusiasts in the Five Northwestern Provinces

In light of the agreement between Kim Il-sung and Pak Hon-yong, the CKCPMEFNP was convened with support from the leading centres of the Korean communist movement. However, a conflict between indigenous communists, classified as belonging to the domestic faction, began to work against Kim Il-sung when it became clear he sought complete independence from the CPK. This struggle would culminate with Kim Il-sung's speech to the 2nd Congress of the Workers' Party of North Korea, in which he criticised the domestic faction and fellow communist O Ki-sop directly. However, at the conference, Kim Il-sung was still careful of confronting the CPK and Pak Hon-yong in line with the aforementioned agreement.

Debate on front strategy and tendencies of right and left
Two different lines were articulated at the conference. O Ki-sop, the representative of the Pak Hon-yong line, espoused the idea of a popular front while Kim Il-sung and his supported advocated a national united front strategy. The Pak Hon-yong overall line was adopted by the conference, but a compromise was reached in several areas. Kim Il-sung's national united front strategy explicitly called for an alliance with the capitalist class and the landlords, while the popular front line opposed this. While this line had to be supported by his Soviet allies evidence points to the fact that Kim Il-sung had held this stance during his time as a partisan fighter. However, for Kim Il-sung this was nothing more than a tactic. He still emphasised the importance of maintaining the proletarian leadership in such an alliance, while frankly admitting that the North Korean communist movement was weak and the capitalist class powerful. On the other hand, O Ki-sop called for the establishment of a "united, people's self-reliant republic". He never mentioned capitalists and landlords in his speech, but warned against bringing pro-Japanese, pro-imperialist and reactionaries into the popular front. This was in direct opposition to Kim Il-sung's more inclusive line, and O Ki-sop went further and called for the "construction of a new nation by selected Communists." Kim Il-sung would later criticise O Ki-sop for his stance at the 2nd Party Congress in 1948, stating that the belief that the national united front strategy "would give the party a setback [and] make the party rightist-oriented" was wrong. This part of the debate produced the document "Resolution on the Establishment of the Political Line and the Expansion and Strengthening of the Organisation". Most of Kim Il-sung's suggestions featured in the document, but his united national front strategy was not mentioned at all.

Otherwise, there were the points of agreements. Both O Ki-sop and Kim Il-sung harshly criticised left and right communism and specifically accused the Changan group of practising Trotskyism. However, as with the front strategy, Kim Il-sung was more flexible and inclusive than O Ki-sop. Kim Il-sung suggested that these communists could join the NKBB and CKP if they repented for their actions and were willing to learn from the errors. No such stance was articulated by O Ki-sop. Despite Kim Il-sung's stance, the conference passed the resolution "Criticism Against the Leftist Tendency and Its Sectarian Activities" in a bid to support Pak Hon-yong in his struggle against the Changan group.

Organisation debate
While both O Ki-sop and Kim Il-sung recognised Pak Hon-yong's leadership and achievements, Kim Il-sung was critical of the CPK and considered it a "failure". He criticised the party's problem with factionalism and told the gathering that it was "only two months old", refusing to give age-old legitimacy. As for the party's democratic norms and structure, both O Ki-sop and Kim Il-sung talked about the need for democratic centralism and the importance of Marxist–Leninist beliefs. However, Kim Il-sung stated his opposition to "excessive democracy in which [too] many people participate in discussing all matters", thereby calling for the centralisation of power. O Ki-sop for that matter never criticised the CPK, and called for a standing ovation to Pak Hon-yong at the conference while finishing his report with "Long live the CPK" and in support with the party's national policies "Long live the Sovereignty of the Korean People's Republic." In line with his critical stance, Kim Il-sung called the conference to discuss the following points;
 establishing the NKBB;
 writing party rules;
 issuing of party membership documents;
 the convocation of an All-National Congress of the CPK.

Political scientist Hak Soon Paik writes "I believe that Kim Il-sung clearly took the initiative in the Korean Communist movement by introducing such critical issues of the party [at the conference]." The CPK, being plagued by factionalism, had failed to establish party rules, create membership cards and formalising the party structure. To take an example, the CPK had failed to establish a structure that issued party documents so the initiative shown by Kim Il-sung meant "a great deal" for certain segments in the party. Kim Il-sung proposed to the conference that "If it is technically difficult for the Center to print party membership certificates, let us issue them in north Korea under the approval of the [CPK Central Committee]." The conference passed a draft of party rules, and on Kim Il-sung's suggestion sent it to Seoul to "help" the CPK leadership. The conference unanimously approved "the work in Seoul be assisted by proposing to the [CPK Central Committee] that the draft be decided by the center and printing and other technical matters be carried out in Pyongyang." That is, the NKBB which had been established as a subordinate organ of the CPK took the role of assistant to the CPK Central Committee. Despite this, Kim Il-sung moved carefully and the conference voted unanimously for adding the following text to its internal regulation; "Whenever the [CPK Central Committee] recognises the need of betterment such as reform, etc., the [CPK Central Committee] reserves the right to act accordingly and the Branch Bureau has the duty to obey."

Kim Il-sung called for the convocation of an All-National Congress of the CPK "[to empower the party] cadres who would be elected through [party] action programs, party certificates, party rules and party democracy." He indirectly mentioned the support he had from the Soviet Union, and stated "[that] the Party Congress should be [the one] that will receive the support of the international brother [communist] parties". In this section of the debate, and in the conference more generally, all of Kim Il-sung's proposals were adopted unanimously. This means that even the representatives of the CPK Central Committee led by Pak Hon-yong fully endorsed his leadership of conference proceedings.

Election of the Executive Committee

The last item of the proceeding was to elect the composition of the NKBB Executive Committee (which took place on 13 October 1945). 15 individuals drawn from Pyongyang and five provinces were elected to the Executive Committee. The identity of one member remains unknown to this day. 10 members had a background in the indigenous communist movement, and two (Kim Il-sung and An Kil) were former partisans. However, this does not mean that Kim Il-sung was in a clear minority in the Executive Committee. Besides Kim Il-sung and O Ki-sop, the two other leading communists Pak Chong-ae and Kim Yong-bom supported Kim Il-sung and the Soviet line. Besides 71 percent of Executive Committee members having a domestic background that did not mean their position was anti-Kim or critical of him in any way.

At a later date, at the 1st Plenary Session of the Executive Committee, a Standing Committee was elected. The same plenum elected Kim Yong-bom as the First Secretary of the Executive Committee and O Ki-sop as Second Secretary of the Executive Committee There are also reports that Mu Chong was elected to a high-ranking position, but it seems unlikely that those rumours are true. At last, nine Executive Committee departments were established and nine department heads appointed.

Plenary sessions

Officers

First Secretary

Second Secretary

Department

Members

Defeating the Pak Hon-yong line

Communist Party of North Korea

1st Congress

References

Citations

Bibliography
Books:
 
 

Dissertations:
 

Websites:
 

Workers' Party of North Korea
1945 in North Korea
1945 establishments in Korea
1946 disestablishments in North Korea